Roy Rodrigo is an actor in the Philippines.

Career
Rodrigo appeared in Trudis Liit (1996) starring Amy Austria, Jean Garcia and Marijoy Adorable. He did sexy films such as Hapdi Ng Tag-init (1997) with Ana Capri, Ambisyosa (1997) with Glydel Mercado, Tatlo... Magkasalo (1998) with Ara Mina, Sex Education (1999) with Sabrina M., Kesong Puti (1999) with Klaudia Koronel, Kalaro (1999) with Ynez Veneracion, and Hilig Ng Katawan (1999) with Aya Medel, among others.

He also appeared in action movies like 'Di Puwedeng Hindi Puwede (1999) starring Robin Padilla, and Oras Na Para Lumaban (2001) starring Gary Estrada.
 
He was included in the cast of TV series Pangako Sa 'Yo starring Jericho Rosales and Kristine Hermosa, aired in ABS-CBN.

He played as the father of Jason Abalos in Chasing Manila, official entry to the 2010 Shanghai World Expo, a Short Film by Paul Soriano.

Filmography
Chasing Manila (2010) - Jason Abalos, Alessandra de Rossi, Tessie Tomas
Tukso Si Charito 2 (2004) - Raja Montero, John Apacible
Oras Na Para Lumaban (2001) - Gary Estrada, Dan Fernandez
Lakas At Pag-ibig (2001) - Daisy Reyes
Pangako Sa 'Yo (TV series) (2000-2002) - Kristine Hermosa, Jericho Rosales
Favorite Subject: Sex Education (1999) - Sabrina M., Angela Velez
'Di Puwedeng Hindi Puwede! (1999) - Robin Padilla, Vina Morales
Hilig Ng Katawan (1999) - Aya Medel, Allen Dizon
Kalaro (1999) - Ynez Veneracion, Hazel Espinosa
Kesong Puti (1999) - Klaudia Koronel, Deborah Carpio, Anton Bernardo
Sex Education (1999) - Sabrina M., Angela Velez, Simon Ibarra
Tatlong Makasalanan (1999) - Rita Magdalena, Aya Medel, Ana Capri
Sabong (1998) - Criselda Volks, Jay Manalo
Tatlo... Magkasalo (1998) - Ara Mina, Tonton Gutierrez, Rita Avila
Alipin Ng Aliw (1998) - Sabrina M., Gem Castillo, Liz Alindogan
Halik (1998) - Christopher de Leon, Ruffa Gutierrez, Alma Concepcion
Hawakan Mo Ako (1997) - Klaudia Koronel, Leandro Baldemor
Mananayaw (1997) - Rita Magdalena, Eddie Gutierrez, Emilio Garcia
Hapdi Ng Tag-init (1997) - Ana Capri, Rita Magdalena
Ambisyosa (1997) - Glydel Mercado, Tonton Gutierrez, Ronaldo Valdez
Sa Iyo Ang Itaas, Sa Akin Ang Ibaba... Ng Bahay (1997) - Izza Ignacio, Rita Magdalena
Dalaga Na Si Sabel (1997) - Izza Ignacio, Ricky Belmonte
Imbestigasyon Kay Lolita Macarena (1997) - Rita Magdalena, Francine Prieto
Dyesebel (1996) - Charlene Gonzales, Matthew Mendoza, Jacklyn Jose
Trudis Liit (1996) - Marijoy Adorable, Julio Diaz, Jackie Aquino, Amy Austria
Bikini Watch (1995) - Andrew E., Ina Raymundo, Glydel Mercado

References

External links

Living people
Filipino male film actors
1974 births